('sour cabbage') is a traditional side dish where the main ingredient is cabbage. It is particularly common in Northern Europe.

The cabbage is finely sliced and slowly cooked with caraway and cumin seeds, apple, vinegar, sugar, salt and butter.  is usually served together with pork. 
 is not to be mistaken for sauerkraut as it does not go through a fermentation process.

See also
 List of cabbage dishes
 Bayrisch Kraut

References

Cabbage dishes
Norwegian cuisine